The R804 road is a regional road in Dublin, Ireland.

The official definition of the R804 from the Roads Act, 1993 (Classification of Regional Roads) Order, 2012  states:

R804: Granby Row - Cork Street, Dublin

Between its junction with R132 at Granby Row and its junction with R110 at Cork Street via Dorset Street Upper, Bolton Street, King Street North, Queen Street, Liam Mellowes Bridge, Bridgefoot Street, Thomas Court and Marrowbone Lane all in the city of Dublin.

See also
Roads in Ireland
National primary road
Regional road

References

Regional roads in the Republic of Ireland
Roads in County Dublin